Ryton & Crawcrook Albion Football Club is a semi-professional English non-league football club from Crawcrook, near Ryton, Newcastle upon Tyne, in Tyne and Wear, currently playing in the Northern League Division Two. The team, nicknamed "Albion" or the "RACA", play their home games at Kingsley Park. They were known as Ryton F.C. until 2011.

History

The club was established in 1970 with a single adult team, operating from a local pub. The club joined the Northern Alliance Division Two in 1988, gaining promotion through winning Division One in 1996-7 and the Premier Division to the Northern League Division Two in 2004–05. During this time, they were also runner's up in the Challenge Cup (1998–99). This position was aided when, in the mid-1990s, the club was granted a Lottery grant to build a ground and club house. The work was completed in 1998 and the ground was officially opened by Prince Andrew, Duke of York, with the club breaking their attendance figures as they attracted 1,100 people to Kingsley Park for a game against Newcastle United.

The senior team currently play in the Northern League Division Two, playing against clubs from across the four county football associations in the region, North Yorkshire; Durham; Northumberland and Cumberland. There was also had a Reserves side ('Ryton & Crawcrook Albion 'A') playing in Northern Football Alliance Division Two.

With an appearance at the Durham Challenge Cup final at the end of the 2009–10 season, club secretary Ken Rodger used the raised profile of the club to try to attract sponsorship in the summer but the money never came through, despite companies' promises. This led to the departure of manager Barry Fleming and his assistant Paul Brown. Former Ashington assistant manager Peter Craggs took over the managerial role. No consistent squad of players was formed and a total of thirty-five players made appearances for the team in the space of a month, and the inconsistency was reflected in numerous heavy defeats on the pitch, including a 10–0 loss to Shildon in October 2010. That season the club finished 22nd in Northern League Division One and was later relegated to Northern League Division Two where it has remained ever since.

Stadium
The club's ground, Kingsley Park Stadium has one full sized turf pitch, with one stand, which is overlooked by the clubhouse. It also has one seven a side size third generation AstroTurf pitch to the rear, which was built with a Football Foundation grant, and is used not only by the club but by the local community and local schools.

Ryton & Crawcrook Albion F.C. is a Chartered Standard Club and is the only club in the area to allow children as young as six years old to play through the age levels to progress to the senior team and play in the FA Youth Cup, FA Vase and the FA Cup. Including girls teams, the club has two adult teams and twelve youth teams operating. The team is also voluntarily operated, including the managerial committee and coaches.

Players

Current squad
As of September 2022

N.B. The Northern League does not use a squad numbering system

Current staff

Club records
The club's first goal in the Northern League Division One was scored by Craig Marron against Bishop Auckland on 9 August 2008. The club's best run in the FA Cup was reaching first round qualifying in the 2008–09 season. In the same season the club had their best performance in the FA Vase, reaching the second round.

In April 2010, the club narrowly lost out to Billingham Synthonia in the Durham Challenge Cup Final & in 2018 reached the final of the Ernest Armstrong Cup only to lose to Chester-le-Street Town. The club won the 2022 Ernest Armstrong Memorial Cup, defeating Newcastle University on penalties in the final.

NORTHERN LEAGUE RECORDS
Biggest Home Win- 8-0 v Sunderland RCA (12/08/06) 
Biggest Home Defeat 0-8 v Billingham Town (09/08/17)
Biggest Away Win- 8-1 v Alnwick Town (11/11/06) 
Biggest Away Defeat- 0-10 v Shildon (27/10/10)
Highest Home Aggregate- 4-6 v Whitehaven (27/08/12) 
Highest Away Aggregate- 2-8 v Hebburn (21/04/12) and 0-10 v Shildon (27/10/10)
Highest Home Attendance- 473 v Whickham (28/04/17)
Highest Away Attendance- 1044 v South Shields (10/10/15)

References

External links
 Official Club website

Football clubs in England
Northern Football League
Association football clubs established in 1970
Football clubs in Tyne and Wear
1970 establishments in England
Ryton, Tyne and Wear